The Voice – Norges beste stemme (Norwegian for The Voice – Norway's best Voice) is a Norwegian reality singing competition and local version of The Voice first broadcast as The Voice of Holland.  It started on 27 January 2012 and the final aired on 25 May 2012 on TV2.

One of the important premises of the show is the quality of the singing talent. Four coaches, themselves popular performing artists, train the talents in their group and occasionally perform with them. Talents are selected in blind auditions, where the coaches cannot see, but only hear the auditioner.

Format 
The series consists of three phases: a blind audition, a battle phase, and live performance shows. Four judges/coaches, all noteworthy recording artists, choose teams of contestants through a blind audition process. Each judge has the length of the auditioner's performance (about two minutes) to decide if he or she wants that singer on his or her team; if two or more judges want the same singer (as happens frequently), the singer has the final choice of coach.

Each team of singers is mentored and developed by its respective coach. In the second stage, called the battle phase, coaches have two of their team members battle against each other directly by singing the same song together, with the coach choosing which team member to advance from each of four individual "battles" into the first live round.  Within that first live round, the surviving four acts from each team again compete head-to-head, with public votes determining one of two acts from each team that will advance to the final eight, while the coach chooses which of the remaining three acts comprises the other performer remaining on the team.

In the final phase, the remaining contestants (Final 24) compete against each other in live broadcasts. The television audience and the coaches have equal say 50/50 in deciding who moves on to the final 4 phase. With one team member remaining for each coach, the (final 4) contestants compete against each other in the finale with the outcome decided solely by public vote.

Coaches

Coaching panel

Coaches' timeline

Series overview
Warning: the following table presents a significant amount of different colors.

Seasons' synopsis

Season 1 (2012) 
The coaches for the debut seasons are singer/songwriter Sondre Lerche, pop star Hanne Sørvaag, Madcon member Yosef Wolde-Mariam and former A-ha member  Magne Furuholmen. Øyvind Mund is hosting the programme while Maria Bodøgaard shares hosting duties as the social media correspondent. Martin Halla from Team Magne Furuholmen won the competition.

Finalists 
 Winning coach/contestant. Winner in bold, eliminated contestants in small font.
 Runner-up coach/contestant. Final contestant first listed.
 Third place coach/contestant. Final contestant first listed.
 Fourth place coach/contestant. Final contestant first listed.

Season 2 (2013)
Due to the success of the inaugural season, a second season was announced for 2013. Sondre Lerche is the only judge returning from the inaugural 2012 season. All other three judges Hanne Sørvaag, Yosef Wolde-Mariam and Magne Furuholmen was replaced by singer and songwriter Espen Lind, singer and former Aqua member Lene Nystrøm and rapper and music producer Tommy Tee. Knut Marius from team Lene Nystrøm won the season.

Season 3 (2015)
The third season premiered in March 2015 with returning coaches Sondre Lerche, Espen Lind as well as Hanne Sørvaag and Yosef Wolde-Mariam who both returned after a one-season hiatus. The hosts remained unchanged. Yvonne Nordvik, mentored by Espen Lind, won the competition.

Season 4 (2017)
The fourth season began in August 2017 with returning coach Yosef Wolde-Mariam and three new coaches Lene Marlin, Morten Harket and Martin Danielle. Starting from this season, voting will be individual-based instead of team-based like last seasons. Thomas Løseth from Team Lene won the competition on 9 December 2017. This was the first season where a coach (Danielle) was not represented in the finale and accordingly a coach (Marlin) advanced with two artists into the finale.

Season 5 (2019)
The fifth season of the show began in January 2019 with the same panelists as last season. Maria Engås Halsne from Team Morten won the competition on 31 May 2019. This was the first season where only two coaches (Marlin and Harket) were represented in the finale. This was also the first season where the top two finalists represented the same coach (Harket).

Season 6 (2021)
The sixth season of the show premiered on 8 January 2021 with returning coach Yosef Wolde-Mariam, comeback coach Espen Lind, with 2 new coaches Ina Wroldsen and Matoma. Erlend Gunstveit, a 1-chair turn from Team Matoma, won the competition on 31 May 2021.

Season 7 (2022)
The seventh season of the show premiered on 7 January 2022 with the same coaches as last season, Espen Lind, Yosef Wolde-Mariam, Ina Wroldsen and Matoma. This was the third season where a coach (Wroldsen) managed to bring two acts into the finale. Wolde-Mariam was not represented in the finale for the second season, the first being in season 5. Jørgen Dahl Moe from Team Ina won the competition on 27 May 2022.

Season 8 (2023)
The eighth season premiered 6 January 2023 with Espen Lind, Yosef Wolde-Mariam, and Ina Wroldsen returning as coaches. Matoma did not return, and he was replaced by Jarle Bernhoft.

See also
The Voice (franchise)

References

External links
 Official website

Norway
2012 Norwegian television series debuts
2010s Norwegian television series